Two ships of the Royal Navy have been named HMS Aubrietia:

  was an  launched in 1916 and sold in 1922
 

Royal Navy ship names